Henry is an unincorporated community in Franklin County, Virginia, United States. Henry has a post office with ZIP code 24102.

References

Unincorporated communities in Franklin County, Virginia
Unincorporated communities in Virginia